Avery Township is one of sixteen townships in Hancock County, Iowa, USA.  As of the 2000 census, its population was 387.

History
Avery Township was named for Anson Avery, a pioneer settler.

Geography
According to the United States Census Bureau, Avery Township covers an area of 35.88 square miles (92.94 square kilometers); of this, 35.84 square miles (92.82 square kilometers, 99.87 percent) is land and 0.04 square miles (0.11 square kilometers, 0.12 percent) is water.

Cities, towns, villages
 Goodell (east three-quarters)

Adjacent townships
 Ell Township (north)
 Union Township, Cerro Gordo County (northeast)
 Grimes Township, Cerro Gordo County (east)
 Wisner Township, Franklin County (southeast)
 Pleasant Township, Wright County (south)
 Belmond Township, Wright County (southwest)
 Twin Lake Township (west)
 Liberty Township (northwest)

Cemeteries
The township contains Amsterdam & Calvary Cemeteries.

Landmarks
 Eldred Sherwood Park

School districts
 Belmond-Klemme Community School District
 Sheffield Chapin Meservey Thornton Community School District

Political districts
 Iowa's 4th congressional district
 State House District 12
 State Senate District 6

References
 United States Census Bureau 2008 TIGER/Line Shapefiles
 United States Board on Geographic Names (GNIS)
 United States National Atlas

External links
 US-Counties.com
 City-Data.com

Townships in Hancock County, Iowa
Townships in Iowa